Gaëtan Krebs (born 18 November 1985) is a retired French professional footballer who played as a midfielder.

Career
Krebs began his career in his native country with FC Sentheim and joined in 2000 to FC Mulhouse. In summer 2001 he left Mulhouse and signed with RC Strasbourg Alsace where he enjoyed success in the club's youth ranks, helping them through to the final of the Gambardella Cup in 2003.

Krebs finally made his senior debut during the 2005–06 season in a goalless home draw with Sochaux on 3 December 2005. However, he only managed one further league appearance for the club, although he did feature four times in their UEFA Cup campaign that season.

He was loaned out to German side Sportfreunde Siegen, playing in the Regionalliga Süd, in the 2006–07 season. Here, he scored his first senior goal, equalising at 1. FC Saarbrücken on 25 August 2006.

In June 2007, he moved permanently to top flight club Hannover 96 for €500,000 on an initial two-year contract until 30 June 2009.

On 2 June 2009, he signed a three-year contract with Karlsruher SC.

References

External links
 
 Gaëtan Krebs at kicker.de 

1985 births
Living people
Footballers from Mulhouse
Association football midfielders
French people of German descent
French footballers
French expatriate footballers
French expatriate sportspeople in Germany
Expatriate footballers in Germany
Bundesliga players
2. Bundesliga players
3. Liga players
Hannover 96 players
Karlsruher SC players
RC Strasbourg Alsace players
Sportfreunde Siegen players
SV Elversberg players